Hamatocaulis is a genus of mosses belonging to the family Amblystegiaceae.

The genus was first described by Lars Hedenäs in 1989.

The genus has cosmopolitan distribution.

Species:
 Hamatocaulis lapponicus
 Hamatocaulis vernicosus

References

Hypnales
Moss genera